Marcus Henderson (born March 16, 1973) is a rock and heavy metal guitarist from the San Francisco Bay area. His previous bands include Drist and Hellbillys as well as work for En Vogue and Simon Stinger.  In 2005, he was chosen to take the role as one of the lead guitarists for the Guitar Hero series. Marcus is also the on-screen guitarist for the Hal Leonard DVD books "Metal Guitar" and "Guitar Technique".

In August 2009, Henderson filmed the guitar instructional video, "Rock Guitar Heroics" in Santa Rosa, CA.

Discography
Below is a list of the songs in the Guitar Hero series on which Marcus performed the guitar track.

Further video game work
Marcus Henderson has also contributed other works to various games, most notably vocals in "I Wanna Be Sedated" by the Ramones, as well as the bass track in Pantera's "Cowboys From Hell" from Guitar Hero. He is credited on the Halo suite with Steve Vai for the Video Games Live Vol 1 CD. He was also one of the four main consultants on song selection for the Guitar Hero II setlist. He also recorded the guitar tracks for the EA game 1louderthan10 2011 update as the "Bergen Hammer" and provided Heavy Metal guitar sounds for the game as well as providing various video lesson and audio licks for BandFuse: Rock Legends.

Epiphone Apparition/Marcus Henderson Signature Model
"The Apparition" is an electric guitar designed and endorsed by Marcus Henderson. It is built by the Epiphone Guitar Company. The Marcus Henderson Signature Model has several features that are built to increase tonal capabilities by including a "kill" button to open the pickup circuit, creating a staccato or choppy sound depending on how fast you press it, as well as a Floyd Rose double locking tremolo system.

Philanthropy
In 2007, Henderson signed on as an official supporter of Little Kids Rock, a nonprofit organization that provides free musical instruments and instruction to children in under-served public schools throughout the USA. He sits on LKR's Honorary Board of Directors. Other charitable endeavors include providing signed auction items for the Grammy foundation and musicares.

References

 

1973 births
American heavy metal guitarists
Guitar Hero
Living people
Guitar Hero musicians
21st-century American guitarists